Rodney Jones may refer to:

 Rodney Jones (poet) (born 1950), American poet and professor of English
 Rodney Jones (guitarist) (born 1956), American jazz guitarist
 Rodney Jones (boxer) (born 1968), American boxer

See also
Rod Jones (disambiguation)